Spanish Bay  is a bay in the Canadian province of Nova Scotia.  It is located on the Atlantic coast of Cape Breton Island at the mouth of Sydney Harbour, which forms part of Spanish Bay.  The current name for the bay, "Spanish Bay" (sometimes "Spanish Harbour", "Spaniards Bay" or "Port aux Espagnols") appears on maps of the area at least as far back as 1708.

Description
Spanish Bay opens to the north-west directly onto the southern terminus of the Cabot Strait and so to the Gulf of Saint Lawrence.

The bay's shores are mostly bold & rocky with numerous prominent headlands including Point Aconi, High Cape, Alder Point, Merritt Point, Bonar Head, Oxford Point, Black Point, Cranberry Point, McGillivray Point and Petries Point, although there is a  sandy beach at Florence Beach (Big Pond Beach) and a popular swimming beach at Polar Bear, just to the north of South Bar.

Communities
Communities along the shoreline of Spanish Bay include (from northwest to south to northeast):

Cape Breton County
 Point Aconi
 Alder Point
 Little Pond
 Florence
 Sydney Mines
 North Sydney
 Upper North Sydney
 North West Arm
 Leitches Creek Station
 Leitches Creek
 Balls Creek
 Point Edward
 Edwardsville
 Westmount
 Sydney River
 Sydney
 Whitney Pier
 South Bar
 Victoria Mines
 New Victoria

See also
 List of communities in Nova Scotia

References

Notes
Nautical chart #4266 SYDNEY HARBOUR, published by Canadian Hydrographic Service, 28 February 2014
Nautical chart #4367 FLINT ISLAND TO / À CAPE SMOKEY, published by Canadian Hydrographic Service, 3 April 2003

Bays of Nova Scotia
Landforms of Cape Breton County